Methylobacterium tarhaniae  is a Gram-negative, aerobic and facultatively methylotrophic bacteria from the genus of Methylobacterium which has been isolated from arid soil in Abuja in Nigeria.

References

Further reading

External links
Type strain of Methylobacterium tarhaniae at BacDive -  the Bacterial Diversity Metadatabase

Hyphomicrobiales
Bacteria described in 2013